Alan Charron (born 27 July 1966 in Ottawa, Ontario) is a former Canadian rugby union rugby player. He played 2nd row and all three loose forward positions at club and international level back-row forward and was capped 76 times for the Canadian national team, the Canucks. In fact he also played briefly in a game at prop when his team was shorthanded after injuries and send-offs suffered by his teammates. He played club rugby for the Ottawa Irish (amateur), professionally in England at Moseley Rugby Football club and Bristol as well as in France at Pau and Dax. Represented the Eastern Ontario union for many years winning the National interbranch championship in 1992 and winning the National provincial championships twice with Ontario in 1995 and 1996.

Charron was a favourite with the supporters of many of the European clubs he played for. While playing with Moseley and Bristol he was voted the supporters' Player of the Season for 1996/97 1998/99 respectively and was awarded the BBC West Rugby Player of the Year award in 1999. Voted on two occasions as Canada's outstanding player for the year.

Charron was a vital member of the highly regarded Canadian forward pack that did so well at the 1991 Rugby World Cup, defeating Fiji and Romania and giving both France and New Zealand a hard time. He was one of three Ontario players on the field against New Zealand, the others all coming from British Columbia. He scored a famous try to defeat Wales at Cardiff Arms Park in autumn 1993. That day he was playing out of his usual flank position, packing down in the second row for an injured Norm Hadley.

Managed to crack several international newspapers and magazines 1st team or honourable first XV selection following all four Rugby World Cups he participated in.

Noted for recovering from a severe knee injury to participate in the 2003 Rugby World Cup as the captain of Canada, his fourth Rugby World Cup tournament. Had a full reconstruction of his right knee (torn ACL, MCL, PCL and meniscus in May came back to play four and a half months later. At the time he became only the second international rugby union player of any country to do so, the other being former teammate and previous Canadian captain Gareth Rees.

National team record for caps (76), tied for most games captained (25). Appeared in a world 15 side with his Canadian teammate Rod Snow to celebrate Argentina's centenary. Has appeared a record 5 times for a Canadian wearing the British Barbarian jersey, scoring one try and in fact captained the side for a half on one occasion. Nine international tries (Wales, New Zealand, Romania, Australia, USA, South Africa, Tonga, Japan, Namibia).

Charron retired from international rugby union on Canada's defeat of Tonga in the 2003 Rugby World Cup pool match. Went to a fifth RWC as part of the Canadian national management team in 2007

Inducted into the Eastern Ontario wall of Fame, Ontario Rugby Hall of Fame, Ottawa Sports hall of Fame, Ontario Sport Hall of Fame and was recognised as being one of the top 100 athletes to come from Ottawa.

Charron became Canada's third inductee into the World Rugby Hall of Fame in 2017, following Gareth Rees (inducted in 2011) and Heather Moyse (2016) in being so honoured. Charron finished his international career with 76 games player, 44 total points, and 9 tries scored.

References
2 Game video, 1991 Rugby World Cup Quarter Final, Canada v New Zealand, First Half, Team List on screen. https://www.youtube.com/watch?v=h1XJaPIJ2dk 

1966 births
Living people
Bristol Bears players
Canadian rugby union players
Franco-Ontarian people
Moseley Rugby Football Club players
Sportspeople from Ottawa
Rugby football people from Ontario
Rugby union flankers
Rugby union number eights
Canada international rugby union players
Hillcrest High School (Ottawa) alumni
Canadian expatriate rugby union players
Expatriate rugby union players in England
Expatriate rugby union players in France
Canadian expatriate sportspeople in France
Canadian expatriate sportspeople in England
World Rugby Hall of Fame inductees